This is a list of Maltese football clubs in European competitions. Maltese clubs have participated since 1961, when Hibernians entered the 1961–62 European Cup and Floriana entered the 1961–62 European Cup Winners' Cup.

Active competitions

European Cup / UEFA Champions League
The competition was named European Cup until 1991–92, until it switched its name to UEFA Champions League.

PR = Preliminary round; 1R/2R = First/Second round; 1QR/2QR = First/Second qualifying round; QF = Quarter-finals

Note 1: No clubs entered the Champions League during these seasons as a result of restructuring by UEFA, with entry to the competition limited to the continent's top 24 countries. The league champions entered the UEFA Cup instead.
Note 2: Match originally postponed due to bad pitch conditions caused by heavy rain. FC Santa Coloma suggested an alternative on 30 June, but UEFA awarded Birkirkara a 3–0 away win on 1 July.

Inter-Cities Fairs Cup / UEFA Cup / UEFA Europa League
While the Inter-Cities Fairs Cup (1955–1971) is recognised as the predecessor to the UEFA Cup, it was not organised by UEFA. Consequently, UEFA does not consider clubs' records in the Fairs Cup to be part of their European record. The competition was named UEFA Cup from 1971–72 until 2008–09, than it switched name to UEFA Europa League.

PR = Preliminary round; QR = Qualifying round; 1R/2R = First/Second round; 1QR/2QR/3QR = First/Second/Third qualifying round

UEFA Europa Conference League

1QR/2QR/3QR = First/Second/Third qualifying round; PO = Play-off round

Defunct competitions

European Cup Winners' Cup / UEFA Cup Winners' Cup

PR = Preliminary round; QR = Qualifying round; 1R/2R = First/Second round

UEFA Intertoto Cup
Although the tournament was founded in 1961–62, it was only taken over by UEFA in 1995.

GS = Group stage; 1R/2R = First/Second round

References

External links
UEFA Website
Rec.Sport.Soccer Statistics Foundation

European football clubs in international competitions